Jorge António Pinto do Couto, CvIH (born 1 July 1970) is a Portuguese retired footballer who played as a right winger.

He amassed Primeira Liga totals of 287 matches and 27 goals over 14 seasons, representing in the competition Porto and Boavista and winning 13 major titles between both clubs.

Club career
Couto was born in Argoncilhe, Santa Maria da Feira. During his career he played professionally for FC Porto, Gil Vicente FC (on loan from his alma mater) and Boavista FC. With the first club he was used regularly in his early years, mainly from the bench – shortly after having scored one of the two goals for the Portugal under-20 team in the 2–0 final win against Nigeria, as the nation won the first of its two consecutive FIFA U-20 World Cups – but was a fringe player subsequently.

With Boavista from 1996 until his retirement, Couto had his best years, helping to the side's Primeira Liga and European consolidation although he was already slowing down as they won their only first division title in 2001, being barred by younger Martelinho but still contributing 17 matches and three goals to the feat.

International career
Couto won six caps at full international level, mostly while at FC Porto, the first arriving at age 20. He was not related to club and national teammate Fernando Couto.

Honours
Porto
Primeira Liga: 1989–90, 1991–92, 1992–93, 1994–95, 1995–96
Taça de Portugal: 1990–91, 1993–94
Supertaça Cândido de Oliveira: 1990, 1991, 1993

Boavista
Primeira Liga: 2000–01
Taça de Portugal: 1996–97
Supertaça Cândido de Oliveira: 1997

Portugal
FIFA U-20 World Cup: 1989

References

External links

1970 births
Living people
Sportspeople from Santa Maria da Feira
Portuguese footballers
Association football wingers
Primeira Liga players
Liga Portugal 2 players
FC Porto players
Gil Vicente F.C. players
Boavista F.C. players
Portugal youth international footballers
Portugal under-21 international footballers
Portugal international footballers